Andrey Ivanovich Krylov (born May 10, 1956 in Leningrad) is a former freestyle swimmer from the Soviet Union and four-time Olympic medalist. He first won a silver medal in the 4x200 freestyle relay at the 1976 Summer Olympics in Montreal, Quebec, Canada. Four years later in Moscow Krylov won gold in the 4x200 freestyle relay and silver in the 200m freestyle and 400m freestyle.

References

External links

1956 births
Living people
Russian male freestyle swimmers
Soviet male freestyle swimmers
Swimmers at the 1976 Summer Olympics
Swimmers at the 1980 Summer Olympics
Olympic swimmers of the Soviet Union
Olympic gold medalists for the Soviet Union
Olympic silver medalists for the Soviet Union
World Aquatics Championships medalists in swimming
European Aquatics Championships medalists in swimming
Medalists at the 1980 Summer Olympics
Medalists at the 1976 Summer Olympics
Olympic gold medalists in swimming
Olympic silver medalists in swimming